The Walt Disney World Golf Classic was an annual golf tournament on the PGA Tour. The tournament was played on the Palm and Magnolia courses at the Walt Disney World Resort. It was played under several names, reflecting sponsorship changes.

The tournament was founded in 1971 as the Walt Disney World Open Invitational. From 1974 to 1981, the tournament was played as a two-man team event with a better-ball format. Title sponsors have included Oldsmobile, National Car Rental, Funai, and Children's Miracle Network.

From 2007 to 2012, it was the final event in the PGA Tour Fall Series, and also the final official event of the PGA Tour season. As such, it was a final chance for many players to earn or retain a PGA Tour card through winning or getting into the top 125 on the Tour's money list. The 2010 and 2012 winners, Robert Garrigus and Charlie Beljan respectively, were both outside the top 125 before their wins.

The tournament was removed from the PGA Tour schedule for the 2013–14 wrap-around season after Children's Miracle Network declined to renew their sponsorship and no others were found.

The 2012 purse was $4,700,000, with $846,000 going to the winner.

Television
The event was televised by ESPN and ABC Sports, until the demotion of the event to the Fall Series in 2007, when it was relegated to cable-only on the Golf Channel.  While ESPN and ABC, which are owned by Disney, covered both courses as a form of publicity for both, the Golf Channel covered only the Magnolia course with highlight packages sent in from the Palm.  However, this is the manner in which the network has always covered tournaments with multiple venues.

Courses
The Magnolia Course at Walt Disney World is known as more "tour"-style than its sister the Palm Course. The Palm course is known as the prettier of the two, however. In the 2006 telecast, one commentator is quoted as saying that the Palm course has the better greens of the two courses. The Magnolia has grown to 7,516 yards to battle the usual low scores during the tournament's history. 

The nearby Lake Buena Vista golf course has also been part of the tournament, along with the Palm and Magnolia.

Winners

Notes

References

External links
Official site
PGATOUR.com Tournament website

Former PGA Tour events
Golf in Orlando, Florida
Recurring sporting events established in 1971
Recurring sporting events disestablished in 2012
1971 establishments in Florida
2012 disestablishments in Florida
Disney sports